The Mount Albert Lions are a rugby league club based in Mount Albert, New Zealand. The Lions home ground is at Fowlds Park. Their patron is the former Prime Minister of New Zealand, Helen Clark. In 2008 and 2009 the Lions won the Fox Memorial.

As of 2019 the team is coached by John Ackland.

History

The club was founded in 1928, after a meeting was held in April of that year. They fielded teams in the 3rd and 4th grades. In the early 1930s the club moved to its current location at Fowlds Park in Morningside. In their initial seasons they had trained on Springleigh Avenue at what is now Phyllis Street Reserve. Up until 1934 the club had played in mauve colours but in April of that year they applied to the junior management committee to change their club colours to blue and gold. They gained senior status from the Auckland Rugby League in 1935.

The club has won the Fox Memorial trophy fifteen times; in 1939, 1947, 1950, 1951, 1968, 1969, 1981, 1982, 1984, 1985, 1986, 2004, 2006, 2008 and 2009. In 1984 the Lions won the National Club Competition and in 2002, 2004 and 2005 they won the Bartercard Cup.

In 2006 they defended the Roope Rooster Challenge trophy in all eleven of their games and went on to win the Fox Memorial. In early 2007 they lost the trophy to the Te Atatu Roosters.

Notable players

Kiwis

Des Herring (1938)
Bob Banham (1939)
Bert Leatherbarrow (1939)
Arthur McInnarney (1939)
Ray Cranch (1951)
Don Hammond (1959)
Ray Wilson (1969)
Richard Bolton (1972)
John Ackland (1983)
Shane Cooper (1985)

Other NZ representatives
Players who represented New Zealand before or after playing for Mt Albert.

Gordon Campbell
Claude List
Wilf Hassan
Roy Hardgrave
Cliff Satherley
Ted Mincham

Bartercard Cup
Between 2000 and 2005 the Lions competed in the national Bartercard Cup competition. Under the guidance of Brian McClennan they were the most successful club in the competition's history, being champions three times and twice winning the minor premiership. However the club had a slow start to the competition, not making the playoffs in the first two years. Their place in the Bartercard Cup was taken over by the Auckland Lions, an entity which represented Mount Albert as well as other neighbouring clubs. In 2007 the Auckland Lions also competed in the NSWRL Premier League but they were replaced in 2008 by the Auckland Vulcans.

 *Two points for a Bye as the Ngongotaha Chiefs withdrew from the competition

Mount Albert Senior Team Records (1928-1944)
The season record for the most senior men’s team in the club.

All time top point scorers (1935-1944)
The point scoring lists are compiled from matches played in matches from the first grade championship, the Roope Rooster, Phelan Shield, and Sharman Cup only. One off matches and exhibition matches are not included. The matches and point scorers includes the combined Newton-Mount Albert side of 1942.

References

External links
Official Club Website
Mount Albert's NZRL Page

 
Rugby clubs established in 1927
1927 establishments in New Zealand